Jeremiah Christian Castor Tiangco (born August 5, 1997) is a Filipino singer, dancer, host, vlogger, entrepreneur and director. He is the second grand champion of GMA Network's singing competition The Clash. Tiangco is currently a mainstay performer of the musical-comedy variety show All-Out Sundays.

Career 
Tiangco started out as a contender in It's Showtime's Tawag ng Tanghalan, where he was a two-time defending champion in the second season. He also auditioned for the first season of The Clash.

In 2023, He is set to have his first major concert entitled Dare to Be Different, where he is also making his directorial debut, in collaboration with Lee Junio Gasid.

Performances

Discography

Filmography

Concert

Awards and nominations

References

External links 

 
 Sparkle GMA Artist Center profile
 

1997 births
Living people
21st-century Filipino singers
Participants in Philippine reality television series
Reality show winners
GMA Network personalities
GMA Music artists
People from Imus
People from Cavite
21st-century Filipino male singers
Filipino television presenters
Filipino television variety show hosts
21st-century Filipino businesspeople